The Great Lakes Valley Conference (GLVC) is a college athletic conference affiliated with the National Collegiate Athletic Association (NCAA) at the Division II level. Its thirteen member institutions are located in the U.S. states of Illinois, Indiana, and Missouri, with an Iowa school joining in July 2023. There are also six associate members who participate in sports not sponsored by their home conferences.

History

Formation

The GLVC grew out of discussions that started in 1972 between the athletic directors of Kentucky Wesleyan College, Bellarmine College (today Bellarmine University), and Indiana State University at Evansville (renamed University of Southern Indiana in 1985), with the goal of forming a men's basketball conference. The discussions later grew to include Indiana Central University (renamed University of Indianapolis in 1986), Saint Joseph's College, and Ashland College (today Ashland University). On July 7, 1978, at a meeting in Louisville hosted by Bellarmine, these schools formed the GLVC, with the intention of competing in the 1978-79 season. Ashland, though considered a charter member, did not begin conference play until the league's second season, in 1979-80. From the time of its founding, the GLVC has been a member of NCAA Division II.

While the origins of the conference's name are lost to history, its initial footprint was bordered by the Great Lakes in the north and the Ohio Valley in the south. Following Southern Indiana's departure in July 2022, Indianapolis is the only remaining charter member.

The GLVC has been led by a full-time commissioner since 1996, first Carl McAloose (1996-2000), then Jim Naumovich (2000-present). The conference office is located in Indianapolis. From 1978 to 1996, the Faculty Athletics Representatives (FARs) of the member institutions were responsible for operating the conference. The FARs (rather than the athletic directors) still cast the institutional votes at meetings where the presidents and chancellors are not present. This feature gives the GLVC a governance structure that is unique among Division I and Division II conferences.

Though conceived as a men's basketball league, the GLVC from the start planned to sponsor championships in golf, tennis, baseball, cross country, and track & field. The conference crowned golf and tennis champions in 1978-79 and added cross country and baseball the following year. Soccer became the sixth sport rather than track & field, with the first conference tournament held in 1980. In 1982, when the demise of the Association of Intercollegiate Athletics for Women (AIAW) brought women's college athletics under the NCAA, the GLVC added women's championships in basketball, tennis, cross country, volleyball, and softball.

Expansion of membership and sport sponsorship
The conference experienced steady growth through the first three decades of its existence, expanding from six members to sixteen. The first addition was Lewis University in 1980, followed in 1984 by Indiana University – Purdue University Fort Wayne (IPFW; the athletic program is now Purdue Fort Wayne), then Northern Kentucky University in 1985 and Kentucky State University in 1989. The conference lost its first members with the departure of Ashland and Kentucky State, effective summer 1995, but nonetheless increased in size when Quincy University, Southern Illinois University Edwardsville (SIUE) and the University of Wisconsin–Parkside began competition that fall, followed by the University of Missouri–St. Louis (UMSL) one year later. These changes initiated a westward shift in the GLVC's geographical footprint that has continued to the present.

The 1990s also featured an expansion in sports sponsorship. In 1995-96 the GLVC crowned its first champions in women's soccer and in men's and women's track and field. Women's golf was added in 1998-99, followed by men's and women's indoor track and field in 1999-2000. These additions increased the total number of conference sports from eleven to seventeen.

After IPFW left in 2001 to move to Division I, the GLVC considered further expansion, but not before redefining conference membership in 2005 to require the athletic program of each member to include seven core sports (men's and women's basketball, women's volleyball, men's and women's soccer, softball, and baseball). The eleven members at the time all sponsored these sports, and subsequent new members would be required to sponsor them as well. Previously, the GLVC had no sports sponsorship requirement other than the NCAA Division II minimum (that every member must sponsor at least ten sports, including men's and women's basketball). The conference began awarding the Commissioner's Cup to the member institution with the greatest success across the seven core sports, while continuing to award its All-Sports Trophy to the most successful program overall.

In the fall of 2005 the GLVC welcomed three more members—Drury University, Rockhurst University, and the University of Missouri-Rolla (known as Missouri University of Science and Technology, or Missouri S&T, since 2008). SIUE left for Division I and the Ohio Valley Conference in 2008, but the conference continued to grow with the additions of Maryville University and the University of Illinois Springfield, which began GLVC competition in the fall of 2009. The GLVC reached sixteen members with the admission of William Jewell College, which began competing in fall 2011.

As the conference continued to grow, basketball remained its strongest sport, and the conference tournament, usually including both genders at the same neutral site, became its signature event. A GLVC team played in the championship game of the NCAA Division II men's basketball tournament in eleven consecutive seasons (1993-94 through 2003-4). Kentucky Wesleyan, winner of four men's national championships prior to the creation of the GLVC, won four more as a conference member, while Southern Indiana, Bellarmine, and Drury won one apiece, and Northern Kentucky won two women's national championships. Meanwhile, the GLVC became the leading Division II conference in swimming and diving. During its first decade in the conference, Drury won ten men's national championships and four women's national championships in the sport. After men's and women's swimming and diving became conference sports in 2013-14, the annual GLVC swimming and diving meet grew to become the most financially lucrative of the conference's championship events, surpassing the basketball tournament.

The admission of William Jewell, approved in October 2009, set in motion plans to crown a football champion, ultimately starting in fall 2012. The addition of football in the GLVC's 35th year of competition was a historic move, as no conference at any level of the NCAA (Division I, II, or III) founded without football had ever added it after existing for so long as a non-football conference. William Jewell joined Indianapolis, Kentucky Wesleyan, St. Joseph's, Quincy, and Missouri S&T to give the GLVC six football-playing members, the minimum number needed to sponsor the sport. They were soon joined by new full member McKendree University and the GLVC's first associate members, Central State University and Urbana University, to give the conference nine teams for its initial football season. Though they competed in the GLVC for just one year, Central State and Urbana eventually were followed by a dozen other schools admitted to the league as associates in one or more sports while maintaining full membership elsewhere.
 
Just as the GLVC was adding football, the conference lost two of its premier basketball programs. In the fall of 2012, Northern Kentucky moved to Division I and the ASUN Conference (then branded as the Atlantic Sun Conference), and one year later, Kentucky Wesleyan left to become a charter member of the newly-formed Great Midwest Athletic Conference (G-MAC). Meanwhile, the GLVC welcomed Truman State University into the conference, to begin competition in 2013–14. The additions of McKendree (coinciding with the departure of Northern Kentucky) and Truman State (coinciding with the departure of Kentucky Wesleyan) kept the GLVC at sixteen members.

In 2014, a unique interconference football partnership with the Mid-America Intercollegiate Athletics Association (MIAA) allowed Lincoln University and Southwest Baptist University to join the GLVC in football while otherwise remaining MIAA members. That autumn, the GLVC became the first NCAA Division II conference to create an inclusive league-wide digital streaming network – the GLVC Sports Network (GLVCSN), which subsequently broadcast football and all other conference sports.

Drury and Bellarmine started wrestling programs for the 2016–17 season, enabling the conference to add wrestling as its 21st championship sport. The initial seven-team GLVC wrestling lineup also included Indianapolis, Maryville, McKendree, Truman State, and Wisconsin–Parkside, all former Division II wrestling independents.

In July 2017, the GLVC announced the addition of men's lacrosse as its 22nd championship sport, in partnership with the Gulf South Conference (GSC) and Peach Belt Conference (PBC). The initial six-team lineup for spring 2018 included Indianapolis, Maryville, and four southern associate members (Young Harris College, the University of Alabama in Huntsville, the University of Montevallo, and Shorter University). The partnership lasted for three seasons, after which the GLVC and GSC-PBC each had enough lacrosse-playing members to offer separate championships in the sport.

Recent history
Charter member St. Joseph's College closed in May 2017 because of financial troubles. One year later, Wisconsin–Parkside left the GLVC to join the Great Lakes Intercollegiate Athletic Conference (GLIAC). Their departures reduced the conference to fourteen members.

In fall 2019 conference membership returned to sixteen with the addition of two schools from the MIAA, Southwest Baptist (elevated from football-only associate to full membership) and Lindenwood University. Their admission voided the MIAA-GLVC football partnership of the previous five seasons (2014 through 2018), resulting in Lincoln rejoining MIAA football. After just one year the conference reverted to fifteen members, as charter member Bellarmine moved to Division I and the ASUN Conference, effective fall 2020.

In 2019 the GLVC and G-MAC established the annual America's Crossroads Bowl in Hobart, Indiana, featuring their highest-ranking football teams not qualifying for the NCAA Division II playoffs. In the 2021 and 2022 seasons, members of the two conferences also played a two-game crossover in the third and fourth Saturdays of the football season. 

The GLVC added two women's sports for 2019–20, bowling and lacrosse, bringing the total number of conference sports to 24. In women's bowling, the initial lineup included 2017 national champion McKendree, fellow full members Drury, Lewis, and Maryville, plus associate members Lincoln, the University of Central Missouri, and Upper Iowa University. In women's lacrosse, the initial lineup in spring 2020 consisted of seven full members—national powers Lindenwood and Indianapolis, along with Lewis, Maryville, McKendree, Quincy, and Rockhurst. The two sports were an immediate success, with Lindenwood (2021) and Indianapolis (2022) winning national championships in women's lacrosse and McKendree (2022) in women's bowling.

In March 2020, GLVC winter and spring sport competitions ended when the NCAA suspended play due to the COVID-19 pandemic. For the 2020-21 academic year, the GLVC held its fall 2020 conference sport competitions in spring 2021. Of the sixteen Division II conferences sponsoring football at the time, the GLVC was one of just four (with the G-MAC, Mountain East, and South Atlantic Conference) to crown a football champion in spring 2021.

The most recent departures from the GLVC came at the end of the 2021-22 academic year, when charter member Southern Indiana joined Lindenwood in moving to Division I and the Ohio Valley Conference, temporarily reducing the league to thirteen schools. They were replaced by associate member Upper Iowa, admitted to the GLVC as a full member effective fall 2023, and former football associate Lincoln, admitted effective fall 2024.

With the addition of new members, the GLVC amended the core sports requirement that had been in place since 2005. Starting in 2023-24, all full members must sponsor men's and women's basketball, men's and women's soccer, four additional men's sports, and four additional women's sports.

Divisional Play
The GLVC first adopted divisional play in 1996, for volleyball only. That sport competed in Blue and Green divisions until 2004, when it returned to a single table. All other sports competed in a single table until the conference expanded to fourteen members in 2005, when two seven-team divisions were adopted for basketball and most other core sports.

The organizational structure of the conference has varied dramatically since then, reflecting changes in membership and in the overall number of league members. As an added variable, the same structure has never been applied across all sports in any given year. For example, men's and women's basketball played in two divisions from 2005-9 and again from 2011-17, three divisions in 2009-11, 2017-18, and 2020-22, and in a single table in 2018-20 and 2022-23, while during the same years, men's and women's soccer always played a single table. Two-division structures have been labeled East-West or Blue-Green, while three-division structures have been labeled East-West-North or East-West-Central.

As of 2022-23, the GLVC has divisional play in baseball and in men's and women's tennis, and plays a single table in all other sports with regular season competition.

Chronological timeline
 1978: The Great Lakes Valley Conference (GLVC) was founded. Charter members included Ashland College (now Ashland University), Bellarmine College (now Bellarmine University), Indiana Central University (now the University of Indianapolis), Indiana State University at Evansville (now the University of Southern Indiana), Kentucky Wesleyan College, and Saint Joseph's College. Competition began in fall 1978.
 1980: Lewis University began GLVC competition in fall 1980.
 1982: The GLVC began to sponsor championships in women's sports.
 1984: Indiana University–Purdue University Fort Wayne (IPFW) began GLVC competition in fall 1984.
 1985: Northern Kentucky University began GLVC competition in fall 1985.
 1989: Kentucky State University began GLVC competition in fall 1989.
 1995:
 Ashland and Kentucky State left the GLVC at the end of the 1994-95 academic year. Ashland began competing in the Great Lakes Intercollegiate Athletic Conference (GLIAC) in fall 1995, and Kentucky State joined the Southern Intercollegiate Athletic Conference (SIAC) in fall 1997.
 Quincy, Southern Illinois University Edwardsville, and the University of Wisconsin–Parkside began GLVC competition in fall 1995.
 1996: The University of Missouri–St. Louis began GLVC competition in fall 1996.
 1998: The GLVC held its first conference tournaments in men's and women's basketball, at the conclusion of the 1997-98 regular season.
 2000: A record crowd of 9,402 attended the men's final at the GLVC basketball tournament, held at Roberts Stadium in Evansville, Indiana. Kentucky Wesleyan defeated Southern Indiana 90–88.
 2001: IPFW left the GLVC at the end of the 2000–01 academic year to become an NCAA D-I Independent.
 2005:
 Core sports requirement established.
 Drury University, the University of Missouri–Rolla (now the Missouri University of Science and Technology) and Rockhurst University began GLVC competition in fall 2005.
 2008: Southern Illinois Edwardsville (SIUE) left the GLVC at the end of the 2007-8 academic year, and joined NCAA Division I as a member of the Ohio Valley Conference (OVC) in fall 2008.
 2009: The University of Illinois Springfield (UIS) and Maryville University began GLVC competition in fall 2009.
 2011: William Jewell College began GLVC competition in fall 2011.
 2012:
 Northern Kentucky left the GLVC at the end of the 2011-12 academic year, and joined NCAA Division I as a member of the Atlantic Sun Conference in fall 2012.
 McKendree University began GLVC competition in fall 2012.
  Central State University and Urbana University joined the GLVC as associate members in football in fall 2012.
 2013:
 Kentucky Wesleyan left the GLVC at the end of the 2012-13 academic year, and began competing in the Great Midwest Athletic Conference (G-MAC) in fall 2013. Kentucky Wesleyan remained in the GLVC as an associate member in football for fall 2013.
 Football associates Central State and Urbana left the GLVC after just one season of competition. Urbana joined the Mountain East Conference as an all-sports member in fall 2013. Central State joined the SIAC as a football associate in fall 2013, then as an all-sports member in fall 2015. 
 Truman State University began GLVC competition in fall 2013.
 2014:
 Lincoln University and Southwest Baptist University joined the GLVC as associate members for football in fall 2014.
 The GLVC Sports Network (GLVCSN) debuted. 
 2017: Saint Joseph's College closed at the end of the 2016-17 academic year.
 2018:
 The University of Alabama in Huntsville, the University of Montevallo, Shorter University and Young Harris College joined the GLVC as associate members in men's lacrosse for spring 2018.
 Wisconsin–Parkside left the GLVC at the end of the 2017-18 academic year, and began competing in the GLIAC in fall 2018.
 Ouachita Baptist University joined the GLVC as an associate member in men's wrestling in fall 2018.
 2019:
 Shorter University ended its associate membership in men's lacrosse at the end of the 2018-19 academic year.
 Southwest Baptist began GLVC competition as a full member in fall 2019, after five seasons as an associate member in football (2014 through 2018).
 Lindenwood University began GLVC competition in fall 2019.
 Lincoln ended its associate membership in football after five seasons of competition (2014 through 2018) but re-joined as an associate member in women's bowling for 2019-20.
 America's Crossroads Bowl established.
 The University of Central Missouri and Upper Iowa University joined the GLVC as associate members in women's bowling for 2019-20.
 2020:
 Lander University joined the GLVC as an associate member in men's lacrosse for spring 2020.
 In March, the COVID-19 pandemic forced suspension of competition for the remainder of the 2019-20 academic year. For the 2020-21 academic year, the GLVC held its fall 2020 conference sport competitions in spring 2021.
 Bellarmine left the GLVC at the end of the 2019-20 academic year, and joined NCAA Division I as a member of the ASUN Conference in fall 2020.
 Five associate members left the GLVC: Alabama–Huntsville, Montevallo, Lander and Young Harris in men's lacrosse, and Lincoln in women's bowling, all at the end of the 2019-20 academic year.
 Davenport University joined the GLVC as an associate member in men's wrestling (fall 2020) and men's lacrosse (spring 2021).
 2021: Missouri Western State University joined the GLVC as an associate member in women's lacrosse for spring 2021.
 2022:
 Southern Indiana and Lindenwood left the GLVC at the end of the 2021-22 academic year, and joined NCAA Division I as members of the OVC in fall 2022.
 Newman University joined the GLVC as an associate member in women's bowling for 2022-23.
 2023:
 Core sports requirement revised.
 Upper Iowa to begin GLVC competition as a full member in fall 2023, after four seasons as an associate member in women's bowling (2019-20 through 2022-23).
 2024: Lincoln to begin GLVC competition as a full member in fall 2024.

Member schools

Current members
The GLVC currently has 13 full members, including nine private and four public institutions:

Notes

Future members

Notes

Associate members
The GLVC currently has six associate members, including four private and two public institutions. One of the associates, Upper Iowa, will become a full conference member in July 2023. Years listed in this table are calendar years. For schools that play only spring sports (such as men's lacrosse) in the GLVC, the calendar year of arrival precedes the first season of competition.

Notes

Former members
Former members of the GLVC include six public and five private institutions:

Notes

Former associate members
Former associate members of the GLVC include five public and three private institutions. Years listed in this table reflect calendar years. For fall sports, the calendar year of departure is the year after the last season of competition. For spring sports, the calendar year of arrival precedes the first season of competition:

Notes

Membership timeline

Sports sponsorship

Conference sports
The seven sports indicated with a green background were designated "core sports" and required of all full members from 2005-23. Effective fall 2023, all full members are required to sponsor men's and women's basketball, men's and women's soccer, four additional men's sports, and four additional women's sports.

Men's conference sports, by school

Women's conference sports, by school

Non-conference NCAA sports, by school

In addition to the listings in this table:
 McKendree, Quincy, and William Jewell sponsor varsity teams in women's wrestling, classified as an "emerging sport" by the NCAA. Future member Upper Iowa plans to add women's wrestling in 2024-25.
 Drury sponsors a varsity team in women's triathlon, classified as an "emerging sport" by the NCAA.
 Some GLVC members give varsity status to teams in non-NCAA sports and to other club teams. These include the men's and women's ice hockey teams of McKendree and Maryville, which compete at the club level in the American Collegiate Hockey Association (ACHA). While some GLVC members administer their club sports through their athletics departments, others operate their club sports as student organizations outside of athletics.

National champions
Since the founding of the conference, members of the GLVC have won 33 NCAA Division II national championships and two NCAA National Collegiate championships (indicated in green). "National Collegiate" is the NCAA's official term to describe championship events open to members of more than one NCAA division.

See also
Great Lakes Valley Conference men's basketball tournament

Great Lakes Valley Conference women's basketball tournament

List of Great Lakes Valley Conference football standings

References

External links

 
Sports in Indianapolis
Organizations based in Indianapolis